Dorcadion mucidum is a species of beetle in the family Cerambycidae. It was described by Dalman in 1817, originally under the genus Lamia. It is known from Spain.

Subspecies
 Dorcadion mucidum annulicorne Chevrolat, 1862
 Dorcadion mucidum mucidum Dalman, 1817
 Dorcadion mucidum rondense (Verdugo, 2002)

See also 
Dorcadion

References

mucidum
Beetles described in 1817